Over the Top Wrestling, commonly abbreviated to OTT, is an Irish professional wrestling promotion based in Dublin, Ireland, that was founded in 2014. The promotion mixes elements of traditional pro wrestling, comedy and sports entertainment. Over the Top Wrestling showcases the best Irish talent and also brings in renowned stars from overseas.  Shows typically took place in Dublin's Tivoli Theatre until its demise. Events now take place primarily in the Smithfield area of Dublin and in Belfast at the Europa Hotel. OTT also runs shows from Limerick, Derry and Wexford. Special 'Supershows' occur at the National Stadium periodically. 'Contenders' billed shows featuring up and coming local talent are run from the National Stadium's Ringside Club. As of 2022, Over The Top Wrestling expanded into Wolverhampton, England.

History 
Founded in 2014 as an alternative to the family friendly offerings on the Irish wrestling scene at the time, OTT was aimed at an over 18s audience with the intention of giving adult wrestling fans something grittier to enjoy, with a shift away from a PG product. Initially the show focused mainly on Irish talent, with gimmicks relating to Irish culture such as the Traveller influenced Luther Ward and the Ward Family, "Session Moth" Martina, the working class-styled Lads from the Flats and the elitist "Lord of The Manor" Paul Tracey. The show was initially composed of wrestlers trained by Main Stage Wrestling and Fight Factory training schools. As the promotion evolved it attracted more renowned stars from abroad and now boasts a vibrant mix of Irish and international talent.

Post-Pandemic Era
After 17 months without a show due to the COVID-19 pandemic, OTT returned in Belfast on 18 July 2021 with "Welcome Back to the Second Half". The show featured predominantly Irish mainstays from the pre-pandemic OTT era and a debuting CJ West, as well as a number of imports based in the UK such as Omari, Emersyn Jayne, Jamie Hayter & Mark Haskins. This show seen the unification of the GN Title held by Adam Maxted and the Vacated OTT World Title in a match won by Mark Haskins to become double champion. 
A Tag tournament eliminator was also held due to Moustache Mountain vacating their titles because of a lack of defenses. The tournament finals seen The Kings of The North (Bonesaw & Damien Corvin) beat The Lads From the Flats (Paddy M & Session Moth Martina) win to the belts for the fourth time.

The following shows seen the promotion of a number of the contenders roster including Justin Daniels, and Danny Cross (simply known as “Jay”) who won the OTT Tag Team Titles with B.Cool on his main roster debut versus Kings Of The North. Liamo also became a regular on the shows as a manager for Paddy M and Martina, and later made his in-ring debut on Contenders 18; the first Contenders show in the post-pandemic era - a show which also introduced Fabio to OTT.
Sammy D defeated Scotty Davis for the NLW Championship at the 2021 Wexford Spiegeltent Festival live event which became the first unrecorded title change in the companies history.

2022 began with a double header of Saturday and Sunday shows "OTT Live at the Ringside". This weekend saw the Tag Team debuts of Ring Technicians (CJ West & Fabulous Nicky) as well as Kelly agus Lynch (Conn Kelly & Dara Lynch). It also saw long time babyface and fan-favorite Terry Thatcher turn heel after being unable to beat Session Moth Martina for the GN Championship. Mark Haskins was unable to make The Road to Scrappermania show in Dublin due to travel issues, as a result an impromptu main event was made for the OTT Tag Team Championships which saw Aussie Open overcome B.Cool and Jay to win the titles for the first time. This show also set up a number of matches for the Scrappermania 6 stadium show.

The Following months seen a soft relaunch of OTT in Dublin as they took up residence in The Complex, a venue in Dublin's city center for their first show in the capital city since the Tivoli days "Poetry Slam". A returning Omari overcame Mark Haskins to become the OTT World Champion.
The following months saw the retirement of B Cool in a career v title match against Sammy D, The formation of "The Draw" (Sammy D, Charlie Sterling and Adam Maxted) and a heel turn by babyface Jay to join the Draw. 2022 ended with the Draw holding the Tag Team Titles, NLW & GN Championships.

Over The Top Wrestling expanded into Wolverhampton, England after the relaunch, booking shows in The Hangar.

Contenders 
OTT Contenders was launched on in May 2017. The idea for these shows was to give up-and-coming Irish talent a platform to perform on as a proving ground. An initial seminar was advertised for an opportunity to perform on the first OTT Contenders show in The Ringside Club of the National Stadium. Hundreds of hopeful applicants from across the country applied to take part but only a handful were picked for the seminar. From those participants, the numbers were further narrowed down to only the best performers. These chosen few perform on the Contenders shows in conjunction with established talent.
People who perform well on Contenders are often given an opportunity on the main show, as has been seen with Club Tropicana (Captain Sexsea and Fabulous Nicky) More Than Hype (LJ Cleary, Nathan Martin and Darren Kearney)Legit 100 (Scotty Davis, Curtis Murray and Micheal May) and later Justin Daniels & Danny Cross.
The contenders and trainees working their way through the OTT system also double as ring crew for the larger OTT shows.

Championships

OTT World Championship

Reigns

Combined reigns

OTT No Limits Championship 

The OTT No Limits Championship is a title in Over the Top Wrestling. The current champion is Trent Seven, who is in his first reign. The championship predates Over The Top and was competed for across various promotions in Europe. Within OTT, it was initially used as the top tier title in the company, until the introduction of the OTT World Championship. It now serves as the company's secondary championship.

Reigns

Combined reigns

OTT Tag Team Championship 

The OTT Tag Team Championship is a title in Over the Top Wrestling primarily contested for by tag teams but has also regularly been defended under Freebird Rules by 3-man teams. The current champions are The Kings Of The North with Damien Corvin and Dunkan Disorderly holding the titles. This is the fifth reign for The Kings Of The North overall and the first for Corvin and Disorderly as a pair. Individually, it is Damien Corvin's fifth reign and Dunkan Disorderly's third reign.

Reigns

Combined reigns

By wrestler

OTT Women's Championship 

The OTT Women's Championship is a title in Over the Wrestling and is competed for by female talent. The current champion is Session Moth Martina who is in her third reign.

Reigns

Combined reigns

OTT Gender Neutral Championship 

The OTT Gender Neutral Championship is a title in Over the Top Wrestling and is open to both male and female talent. The current champion is Danny Cross, who is in his second reign.

Reigns

Combined reigns 

Roster
OTT wrestlers are freelance competitors, meaning they may also appear for multiple promotions worldwide, as well as performing for OTT.

Main roster male talent

Main roster female talent

Non-wrestlers

Special appearances/alumni 

A-Kid
Aoife Valkyrie
Angélico
Aussie Open
Axel Tischer 
B. Cool
Bandido
Candice LeRae
Carlito
Chuck Taylor
CIMA
Cody Rhodes
Colt Cabana
Dalton Castle
Dan Barry
Dante Martin
Darby Allin
Dave Mastiff
Davey Richards
Doug Williams
Drew McIntyre
Eddie Kingston
El Phantasmo
Evil
Fénix
Finn Balor
Flash Morgan Webster
Flip Gordon
Gangrel
Grado
Guerrillas of Destiny
Hirooki Goto
Ilja Dragunov
Jamie Hayter
Jeff Cobb
Joey Janela
JONAH
Jon Moxley
Juice Robinson
Jushin Liger
Keith Lee
Kenny Omega
Kip Sabian
Kris Wolf
KUSHIDA
Low Ki
Matt Riddle
Mark Andrews
Marty Scurll
Masato Tanaka
Matt Cardona
Matt Sydal
Meiko Satomura
Mick Foley
Mike Bailey
Millie McKenzie
Minoru Suzuki
Moose
Orange Cassidy
Pac
Paddy Morrow
Pentagon Jr.
Pete Dunne
Puma King
Rey Horus
Ricky Starks
Ricochet
Rob Van Dam
Rocky Romero
Sami Callihan
Santino Marella
Satoshi Kojima
Scotty Too Hotty
Sanada
Swerve Strickland
Sha Samuels
Shota Umino
Tajiri
Tegan Nox
Tetsuya Naito
Timothy Thatcher
Tomohiro Ishii
Tommy Dreamer
Toni Storm
Travis Banks
Tyler Bate
Veda Scott
Young Bucks
War Machine
Will Ospreay
Zack Gibson
Zack Sabre Jr.

See also

List of professional wrestling promotions in Great Britain and Ireland
List of professional wrestling promotions in Europe
NXT UK

References

External links

 

Irish professional wrestling promotions
2014 establishments in Ireland
Entertainment companies established in 2014